Eric Lee may refer to:
Eric Lee (labor organizer) (born 1955), American-born trade unionist, writer, and web site developer; founding editor of LabourStart
Eric Lee (musician), Hawaiian musician, singer, songwriter, and producer
Eric Lee (footballer) (1922–2012), English former footballer
Eric Lee (Canadian football) (born 1983 in Ghana), Canadian football running back
Eric Lee (American football) (born 1994), NFL defensive end

See also
Eric Lee-Johnson (1908–1993), New Zealand artist and photographer